Rippon Bros was a coach building business thought to have begun as early as the 16th century. 

Historian John Stowe (1524/25 – 1605) reported that in 1555 Walter Rippon made a coach for the Earl of Rutland, and that in 1564 he made another for Queen Elizabeth. It is thought Rippon built the coach but not its decoration.

It is believed the same business was more recently operated in Huddersfield, Yorkshire by William Rippon and Charles Marsom as Rippon & Marsom then from 1882 it was taken on by Rippon's two sons - William Edward Rippon (1858-1949) and Joseph Rippon. Eventually it was owned by Rippon Bros Limited and its chairman was Colonel Reginald Rippon who died in 1969. The business closed in 1970.

References

External links
 List of documents held by The National Archives

Rippon
Manufacturing companies disestablished in 1970
Huddersfield
1970 disestablishments in England